Stevan Živković (born 18 October 1989) is a Serbian football midfielder.

References

External links
 
 Stevan Živković stats at utakmica.rs 
 

1989 births
Living people
Sportspeople from Sremska Mitrovica
Association football midfielders
Serbian footballers
FK Bežanija players
FK Napredak Kruševac players
FK Radnički 1923 players
FK Metalac Gornji Milanovac players
FK Zeta players
FK Mačva Šabac players
Montenegrin First League players
Serbian First League players
Serbian SuperLiga players